Louisiana Highway 114 (LA 114) is a state highway located in Avoyelles Parish, Louisiana.  It runs  in an east–west direction from LA 1 east of Echo to a second junction with LA 1 and LA 451 east of Moreauville.

LA 114 essentially cuts off a long bend in LA 1, bypassing the city of Marksville to the south.  The route travels instead through the smaller communities of Hessmer, Mansura, and Moreauville.  Through traffic southeast of Mansura is directed from LA 114 onto LA 1186, connecting to LA 1 northwest of Moreauville, which leads to Simmesport and eventually into the Baton Rouge metropolitan area.

LA 114 was designated in the 1955 Louisiana Highway renumbering, replacing a portion of former State Route 72 and the entirety of State Route 299.  In 1965, the route was extended from its original eastern terminus in Mansura over the former alignment of LA 1, which was moved to a straighter path along the Kansas City Southern Railway line.  However, this portion of the route, which is now classified as a local road, is intended to be deleted from the state highway system as part of the Louisiana Department of Transportation and Development (La DOTD) Road Transfer Program.

Route description
From the west, LA 114 begins at a T-intersection with LA 1 at the Red River in western Avoyelles Parish. LA 114 crosses the Kansas City Southern Railway (KCS) at grade then follows the rail line southeast through a rural area known as Belle d'Eau. Here, the highway crosses Choctaw Bayou just outside the Grand Cote National Wildlife Refuge. After curving due east, LA 114 intersects LA 1188, which connects to LA 115 south of Hessmer. LA 114 continues into the village of Hessmer on West School Street and intersects LA 115 (Main Street), which connects to the nearby cities of Marksville and Bunkie. LA 114 turns south, running briefly concurrent with LA 115, before resuming an eastward course along East Main Street. Exiting Hessmer, LA 114 proceeds a short distance into the larger town of Mansura, where it becomes known as Baton Rouge Avenue.

In Mansura, LA 114 intersects LA 107 (Valley Street), and the two highways continue east in a concurrency for one block along Baton Rouge Avenue to L'Eglise Street.  Here, LA 115 turns north toward Marksville while LA 114 turns to the southeast, intersecting LA 1186 at the southern limit of Mansura.  Signage directs through traffic bound for Simmesport and Baton Rouge to follow LA 1186 eastward, as it provides a direct connection to southbound LA 1 that largely bypasses Moreauville.   later, LA 114 crosses Bayou Des Glaises at Long Bridge and immediately intersects the northern terminus of LA 29, another connection to Bunkie.

After cutting across a small bend in the waterway, LA 114 closely follows Bayou Des Glaises as it winds its way into the village of Moreauville.  Now known as Bayou Des Glaise Street, LA 114 proceeds to an intersection with Main Street and turns due east.  The roadway along Bayou Des Glaises continues straight ahead as LA 451 toward LA 1.  After following Main Street through town, LA 114 continues a short distance until reaching its eastern terminus at a second intersection with both LA 1 and LA 451, essentially cutting across a massive bend in Bayou Des Glaises.  From this junction, located just west of Hamburg, LA 1 provides connections to Marksville and Alexandria to the north, as well as the aforementioned southbound destinations.

Route classification and data
LA 114 is an undivided two-lane highway for its entire length. The route is classified by the Louisiana Department of Transportation and Development (La DOTD) as a rural major collector west of Mansura, an urban collector through town, and a rural local road east of town. Daily traffic volume in 2013 generally averaged between 1,870 and 3,500 vehicles over the course of the route.

The eastern portion of LA 114, running from LA 29 at Long Bridge and LA 1 near Hamburg, is part of the Louisiana Colonial Trails in the state-designated system of tourist routes known as the Louisiana Scenic Byways.

History
In the original Louisiana Highway system in use prior to 1955, the modern LA 114 was divided among several routes, including State Route 72 from the western terminus near Echo to Mansura; State Route 299 from Mansura to Long Bridge; and State Route 30 from Long Bridge to the eastern terminus near Hamburg.  Routes 30 and 72 were two of the original 98 state highways designated in 1921.  They were the main routes connecting central Avoyelles Parish with the major population centers of Baton Rouge and Alexandria, respectively.  In 1928, Route 299 was created by an act of the state legislature, establishing a connection between Routes 30 and 72.

These highway portions were joined together under the single designation of LA 114 when the Louisiana Department of Highways renumbered the state highway system in 1955.

As the above description indicates, LA 114 originally extended east only as far as LA 107 in Mansura.  At the time, LA 1 entered Mansura from the north co-signed with LA 107 and proceeded along what is now LA 114 through Moreauville to Hamburg.  In 1965, LA 1 was moved onto a new, straighter alignment along the south side of the Kansas City Southern railroad tracks from Simmesport to LA 1186 east of Mansura, bypassing the Moreauville town center.  LA 114 was then extended to cover the old route, establishing its present terminus at LA 1 near Hamburg.  LA 1 utilized LA 1186 as a temporary connector and was co-signed with LA 114 for a short distance in Mansura until the new alignment was extended north to Marksville in 1972.  The route of LA 114 has otherwise remained the same since the 1955 Louisiana Highway renumbering.

Future
Under this plan of "right-sizing" the state highway system, the entirety of LA 114 east of Mansura is proposed for deletion as it no longer meets a significant interurban travel function.

Major intersections

See also

References

External links

Maps / GIS Data Homepage, Louisiana Department of Transportation and Development
Louisiana Colonial Trails at Louisiana Scenic Byways

0114
Transportation in Avoyelles Parish, Louisiana